Pyrgina is a genus of small, tropical, air-breathing land snails, terrestrial pulmonate gastropod mollusks in the family Achatinidae.

Species 
Species within the genus Pyrgina include:
 Pyrgina umbilicata

References

 Nomenclator Zoologicus info

 
Taxonomy articles created by Polbot